Mario Mattei (6 September 1792, Pergola, Marche – 7 October 1870) was an Italian Cardinal, of the Roman noble House of Mattei. He became Dean of the College of Cardinals in 1860.

Personal life
Mario Mattei was born on 6 September 1792 in Pergola, Marche.

He was educated at the Collegio Ghislieri, a Roman college, and at the La Sapienza University where he received a doctorate in utroque iure) and later attended the Pontifical Academy of Ecclesiastical Nobles in 1810. Around 1817, he was ordained a priest.

Cardinal
He was elevated to Cardinal by Pope Gregory XVI in 1832 and was subsequently appointed to the following posts:

1832 – Cardinal-Deacon of St Maria in Aquiro
1842 – Cardinal-Priest of St Maria degli Angeli
1844 – Bishop of Frascati
1854 – Bishop of Porto e Santa Rufina
1860 – Bishop of Ostia and Dean of the Sacred College of Cardinals

Vatican service
In 1843, Mattei was appointed as Arch-Priest of St. Peter's Basilica and held this position until his death in 1870.

Records indicate that Mattei was appointed Camerlengo of the Sacred College of Cardinals twice; between 1834 and 1835 and between 1848 and 1850 and he was also appointed to be the Dean of the College of Cardinals in 1860. He was a participant in the First Vatican Council and in the Papal Conclave of 1846 that elected Pope Pius IX.

References

 

1792 births
1870 deaths
People from Pergola, Marche
19th-century Italian cardinals
Cardinal-bishops of Frascati
Cardinal-bishops of Ostia
Cardinal-bishops of Porto
House of Mattei
Deans of the College of Cardinals
Camerlengos of the Holy Roman Church
Cardinals created by Pope Gregory XVI